Ahmed Dine (born 22 January 1965) is an Algerian boxer. He competed at the 1988 Summer Olympics and the 1992 Summer Olympics.

References

External links
 

1965 births
Living people
Algerian male boxers
Olympic boxers of Algeria
Boxers at the 1988 Summer Olympics
Boxers at the 1992 Summer Olympics
Competitors at the 1987 Mediterranean Games
Competitors at the 1991 Mediterranean Games
Competitors at the 1993 Mediterranean Games
Mediterranean Games bronze medalists for Algeria
Mediterranean Games silver medalists for Algeria
Mediterranean Games gold medalists for Algeria
People from Tipaza Province
Mediterranean Games medalists in boxing
Middleweight boxers
20th-century Algerian people